WWZQ (1240 AM) is a radio station licensed to Aberdeen, Mississippi, United States.  The station airs a Talk radio format, and is currently owned by Stanford Communications, Inc.

References

External links
WWZQ's website

FCC History Cards for WWZQ

WZQ
Talk radio stations in the United States